Scoresby is a suburb in Melbourne, Victoria, Australia, 29 km east of Melbourne's Central Business District, located within the City of Knox local government area. Scoresby recorded a population of 6,066 at the 2021 census.

In the Parish system of Victoria (mainly used with land-ownership documents) the local parish is called Scoresby, a part of the County of Mornington.

History

The area of Scoresby was surveyed in 1857, and named after the Arctic explorer William Scoresby. Scoresby had died the previous year, shortly after his visit to the colony to experiment with terrestrial magnetism near the area which now carries his name. A township developed in the 1870s around the intersection of Stud Road and Ferntree Gully Road. A school was established in 1872, followed by a Methodist church. Once the swampy ground was drained, market gardens were established. Scoresby Post Office opened on 20 January 1890, closed in 1979 and reopened in 1984 as the suburb grew.

Following the First World War, George Hodges Knox settled and established an orchard in Scoresby. He later became a member of Parliament, and was knighted. The City of Knox is named after him.

During the 1950s the market garden industry grew. Scoresby became the Brussels sprout capital of Victoria. In 1959 subdivision of the market gardens began.

Present day

Scoresby contains a number of extensive industrial estates which are home to a variety of major national and international corporations including Nintendo's Australian headquarters.

Caribbean Gardens, an entertainment precinct and market, is open every Wednesday and Sunday. The precinct is centered on Caribbean Lake, which was built for the testing of boats by the boat manufacturer Caribbean Boats. Activities at Caribbean Gardens include buying and selling of all kinds of products, eating, drinking, walking around, music played by bands and computer swap meets. Another popular "Caribbean" place in Scoresby is Caribbean Roller Skating Rink.

There are two primary schools in the area, state school Scoresby Primary School and private school (St. Judes). The secondary education provider in Scoresby is Scoresby Secondary College.

Scoresby has a weather station which collects data for the Bureau of Meteorology. It commenced readings in 1948 and is situated at Latitude 37.87°S and Longitude 145.26°E at an elevation of 80m above sea level. The site name is the Scoresby Research Institute and its site number is 086104, however it is not actually based in Scoresby, but in the suburb of Knoxfield. Hourly weather observations taken from Scoresby can be viewed from the Bureau of Meteorology website.

Scoresby village is the main shopping precinct in Scoresby. It includes a supermarket and many other small stores, hair dressers and other services. These stores are arranged around a central carpark with the local football field behind.

Climate

Scoresby has an oceanic climate with certain subtropical influences similar to the rest of the Greater Melbourne area. It is wetter than Melbourne CBD and the suburbs to the north due to the "bay effect" set up by Port Phillip to the east, where showers are intensified leeward of the bay.

Sport

The suburb has an Australian Rules football team, The Scoresby Magpies, competing in the Eastern Football League.

Scoresby Cricket Club are also located in the suburb of Scoresby, competing in the Ringwood & District Cricket Association, and play their home games out of Exner Reserve.

See also
 Electoral district of Scoresby

References

Suburbs of Melbourne
Suburbs of the City of Knox